Washington Square Mall is a regional shopping mall located on the eastern side of Indianapolis. It opened in 1974 and was renovated/expanded in 1999. Today, the mall consists mostly of Finish Line, Bath & Body Works, and Target, as well as AMC Theatres.

History

This mall was built by Edward J. DeBartolo Sr. and opened in April 1974, supplanting Eastgate Shopping Center three miles to the west, which had opened 1957.  JCPenney, Sears, and many prime tenants made the move from Eastgate to Washington Square.  L. S. Ayres, William H. Block, and Lazarus were also anchors when the mall was built.

Simon Property Group merged with the DeBartolo company in 1996. Simon renovated the mall in 1999.  The mall faced a rough period of decline between 2005 and 2010, at which point several stores, including Old Navy, JCPenney, and Macy's, pulled out. However, with Burlington occupying the former JCPenney since 2003 and Indy Wholesale recently moving into space formerly occupied by Macy's.  Washington Square has all five anchor tenant slots filled for the first time since 2008. Target now occupies the site of Block (later Montgomery Ward), and Dick's Sporting Goods occupies the site of Lazarus since July 2002. In February 2013, Indy Wholesale Furniture announced that it would be going out of business, soon leaving one of the five anchor spots vacant. In early 2014, Washington Square lost BonWorth, Rack Room Shoes, MCL cafeteria, and Foot Locker, with the former three all closing and the latter moving to Cherry Tree plaza a mile west. The mall then lost Aeropostale in early 2016, as well as Buffalo Wild Wings in mid-2018.

As of August 20, 2014, the mall's Facebook page no longer displays the SIMON logo or any SIMON photos, and the mall's page on the SIMON website has been disabled. Soon after, it was announced Jones Lang LaSalle is now managing the mall. Simon voluntarily handed over the deed to the property Aug. 6, eliminating the need for a costly and lengthy foreclosure proceeding. Simon's financial filings showed the company held $25.5 million in debt on Washington Square, which appears to be more than the mall is worth. By 2013, occupancy slipped under 50 percent but came back to 85 or 90 percent when the mall went to a new owner.

On September 29, 2014, it was announced that Sears would be closing in December 2014.

In 2016 The mall was purchased by Kohan Retail Investment Group for $2.5 million and new management was put in place. The new property owner began neglecting not only the property taxes on Washington Square Mall but also the upkeep of the mall as well.  Management had trouble keeping up with garbage collection, maintenance, and other basic needs of the mall when Kohan stopped payments to Washington Square. All things considered, the mall has kept occupancy at a reasonable rate, with small businesses and family-owned shops filling the empty spaces. No major incidents have been reported at the mall by in part due to armed security guards on the grounds at all times.

As of October 2018, Washington Square Mall is up for auction due to unpaid property taxes. The mall as of 2019 is owned by Durga Property LLC.

On January 1, 2020, it was announced that two of the mall's remaining three anchors, Dick's Sporting Goods and Burlington Coat Factory, would be departing the mall, closing those locations and leaving Target as the lone anchor.

References

Tourist attractions in Indianapolis
Buildings and structures in Indianapolis
Shopping malls in Indiana
1974 establishments in Indiana
Shopping malls established in 1974